Fourna is a village and a former municipality in Evrytania in central Greece. Since the 2011 local government reform it is part of the municipality Karpenisi, of which it is a municipal unit. The municipal unit has an area of 132.232 km2. The population of the municipal unit is 625 (2011 census). The municipal unit consists of the villages Fourna, Vracha (Greek: Βράχα), and Kleisto (Greek: Κλειστό).

Notable people 
Dionysius (c. 1670 – after 1744), painter and monk

References

Populated places in Evrytania